Perry State Forest is a state forest in Perry County, Ohio, United States.

References

External links
 U.S. Geological Survey Map at the U.S. Geological Survey Map Website. Retrieved January 12, 2023.

Ohio state forests
Protected areas of Perry County, Ohio